Georgette Miller-Thiollière (7 May 1920 – 23 January 2010) was a French alpine skier. Together with her younger sister Suzanne Thiollière she competed at the 1948 Winter Olympics with and placed fourth in the slalom.

References

1920 births
2010 deaths
French female alpine skiers
Olympic alpine skiers of France
Alpine skiers at the 1948 Winter Olympics
People from Chamonix
Sportspeople from Haute-Savoie